East Farleigh railway station is on the Medway Valley Line in Kent, England, located to the south-west of Maidstone and close to the village of East Farleigh, on the opposite (south) bank of the River Medway, though the station is actually located in Barming parish. It is  down the line from London Charing Cross via . The station and all trains that serve the station are operated by Southeastern.

East Farleigh station is about 50 yards from the medieval East Farleigh Bridge taking foot and road passengers across the river, one of only four such bridges between Maidstone and Tonbridge.

The station has two platforms, staggered to either side of a level crossing.

On the southbound platform is a signal box which remains to control the level crossing. The old ticket office, located in a wooden building on the southbound platform, closed in 1989; this was APTIS-equipped from 1987 until closure. This building then remained disused for many years though in good condition. In 2007, a PERTIS permit to travel ticket machine was installed at the entrance to the southbound platform, which is behind the signal box.

Facilities on the northbound platform are limited to a waiting shelter. A footbridge spans the tracks and is accessed from the northbound platform.

Services
All services at East Farleigh are operated by Southeastern using  EMUs.

The typical off-peak service in trains per hour is:
 2 tph to  via 
 2 tph to  

On Sundays, the service is reduced to hourly in each direction.

References

External links

Borough of Maidstone
Railway stations in Kent
DfT Category F2 stations
Former South Eastern Railway (UK) stations
Railway stations in Great Britain opened in 1844
Railway stations served by Southeastern